Felsberg railway station is a railway station in Domat/Ems, Switzerland. It takes its name from Felsberg, on the opposite side of the Rhine. It is located on the Landquart–Thusis line of the Rhaetian Railway. It is served twice hourly by Chur S-Bahn trains in each direction.

Services
The following services stop at Felsberg:

 Chur S-Bahn:
 : hourly service between Rhäzüns and Schiers.
 : hourly service between Thusis and Chur.

References

External links
 
 

Railway stations in Switzerland opened in 1896
Railway stations in Graubünden
Rhaetian Railway stations